Paroedopa is a genus of picture-winged flies in the family Ulidiidae.

Species
Paroedopa punctigera Coquillett, 1900

Distribution
United States.

References

Ulidiidae
Taxa named by Daniel William Coquillett
Diptera of North America
Monotypic Brachycera genera
Brachycera genera